Scopula moorei is a moth of the family Geometridae. It is found in India.

Subspecies
Scopula moorei moorei
Scopula moorei metarsia Prout, 1938

References

Moths described in 1888
moorei
Moths of Asia